The Silver Logie for Most Outstanding Actor is an award presented annually at the Australian TV Week Logie Awards. It was first awarded at the 30th Annual TV Week Logie Awards in 1988 and is given to recognise the outstanding performance of an actor in an Australian program. The winner and nominees of this award are chosen by television industry juries. Richard Roxburgh holds the record for the most wins, with three.

Winners and nominees

Multiple wins

Programs with most awards

References

Awards established in 1988